Lgov is the name of several inhabited localities in Russia.

Urban localities
Lgov, Kursk Oblast, a town in Kursk Oblast

Rural localities
Lgov, Khotynetsky District, Oryol Oblast, a selo in Ilyinsky Selsoviet of Khotynetsky District of Oryol Oblast
Lgov, Novosilsky District, Oryol Oblast, a settlement in Prudovsky Selsoviet of Novosilsky District of Oryol Oblast